Thomas Edward Purdom (born 1936)  is an American writer best known for science fiction and nonfiction. His story "Fossil Games" was a nominee for the Hugo Award for Best Novelette in 2000. He has also done music criticism since 1988. His works have been translated into German, Chinese, Burmese, Russian, and Czech.  He lives in Philadelphia.

Bibliography

Novels
 
 
 Five Against Arlane (1967)
 Reduction in Arms (1967)
 The Barons of Behavior (1972)

Short fiction
Collections
Lovers & Fighters, Starships & Dragons (2014)
 
Stories

Critical studies and reviews of Purdom's work
Romance on four worlds

References

External links
 
 Tom Purdom on the web
 
Tom Purdom, Lover & Fighter by Michael Swanwick

1936 births
Living people
American male novelists
American music critics
American science fiction writers
Asimov's Science Fiction people
Writers from Philadelphia
Novelists from Pennsylvania
American male non-fiction writers